The 2009 Towson Tigers football team represented Towson University in the 2009 NCAA Division I FCS football season. They were led by first-year head coach Rob Ambrose and played their home games at Johnny Unitas Stadium. They are a member of the Colonial Athletic Association. They finished the season 2–9, 1–7 in CAA play.

Schedule

References

Towson
Towson Tigers football seasons
Towson Tigers football